Jungle Warriors, also called The Czar of Brazil (Euer Weg führt durch die Hölle, "Your Path Leads Through Hell", in Germany) is an action film, released in the United States in November 1984. The film was shot in Mexico and the old West Germany, but recreated the scenario of a South American jungle.  Though is not a well-known film, it stars -among other recognized names- Sybil Danning (a famous American B-movie actress), Dana Elcar (MacGyver's boss on the celebrated TV series) and Paul L. Smith (who appeared in movies like Midnight Express, Dune and Red Sonja). Renowned movie star Dennis Hopper had a secondary role on the film, but later was replaced by actor Marjoe Gortner.

Plot

A group of gorgeous American models take a long trip to South America, to participate in a photo session on a location deep in the jungle, apparently somewhere around Peruvian tropical forest. While flying over a cocaine plantation, their plane is shot down by Cesar, a dangerous drug lord, and the girls are taken prisoner by his army. Cesar suspects that an undercover police officer is among the models (in fact, one of the women actually is a special agent), so he orders his mercenaries to drag the girls into his dungeon for interrogation. After being tortured by Angel, Cesar's sister, and cruelly gang-raped by all soldiers, the models are imprisoned in an underground cell to await Cesar's decision whether to execute them or keep them as slaves for his soldier's "entertainment". With the help of an old female servant, the models manage to escape from the basement jail and get some guns. As they make their way toward freedom, they run into a high-level Mafia meeting there in Cesar's manor. A final gunfight breaks out as the women fight to take revenge and escape alive.

The movie follows the line of sexploitation films (with a mix of Women in prison film and rape and revenge films), being a low-budget production with some nudity and rough sexual-violence. In fact, it contains a large rape scene, showing the defenseless girls tied by the wrists to the dungeon's ceiling and fences and being sadistically stripped, groped and abused by dozens of soldiers. Precisely, this strong scene made the film rated R and, consequently, couldn't aim to a mass audience. On later releases and in the edited for T.V. version, this scene has been deleted, to allow for a wider audience.

Cast and crew

Director		... 

Writers			... Robert Collector, Marc Furstenberg.

Cast:

 Nina Van Pallandt ...  Joanna Quinn
 Paul L. Smith 	...  Cesar Santiago
 John Vernon 	...  Vito Mastranga
 Alex Cord 	...  Nick Spilotro
 Sybil Danning 	...  Angel
 Marjoe Gortner 	...  Larry Schecter
 Woody Strode 	...  Luther
 Kai Wulff 	...  Ben Sturges
 Dana Elcar 	...  D'Antoni
 Suzi Horne	...  Pam Ross
 Mindi Iden 	...  Marci
 Kari Lloyd 	...  Brie Klinger
 Ava Cadell 	...  Didi Belair
 Myra Chason 	...  Cindy Cassidy
 Angela Robinson 	...  Monique Rogers

See also
 Sybil Danning
 Action film
 B-movie
 Sexploitation film
 Rape and revenge films
 Women in prison film

References

External links
 

1984 films
1980s action adventure films
German action adventure films
West German films
1980s exploitation films
Sexploitation films
Rape and revenge films
Women in prison films
Films set in South America
English-language German films
1980s English-language films
1980s German films